KGIG-LP (104.9 FM, "104.9 The Gig") is a low-power FM radio station broadcasting a news/talk format with some music programming devoted to local bands. Licensed to Modesto, California, United States, the station is currently owned by Fellowship of the Earth.

History
The Federal Communications Commission issued a construction permit for the station on June 30, 2003. The station was assigned the KQRP-LP call sign on July 10, 2003, and received its license to cover on May 2, 2005. On April 17, 2012, the station changed its call sign to the current KGIG-LP.

References

External links
 NEW official KGIG website
 Old official website
 

GIG-LP
GIG-LP
Mass media in Stanislaus County, California
News and talk radio stations in the United States
Radio stations established in 2005